The Middle Fork Stanislaus River is a  tributary of the Stanislaus River in the central Sierra Nevada and Stanislaus National Forest of eastern California.

Geography
The river begins at the confluence of Kennedy Creek and Summit Creek in the Emigrant Wilderness. It flows initially northwest, receiving the Clark Fork from the right then turning southwest, through a deep canyon to its confluence with the North Fork Stanislaus River, forming the Stanislaus River.

Power and water infrastructure
There are four dams on the main stem of the Middle Fork – at Donnells, Beardsley, Beardsley Forebay and Sand Bar Flat. The only significant tributary impoundment is Relief Reservoir, formed by Relief Dam on Summit Creek. Middle Fork water is managed by the Spring Gap–Stanislaus hydroelectric project, owned by Pacific Gas and Electric, and the Tri-Dam project owned by the Oakdale and South San Joaquin irrigation districts.

Tunnels connect the four mainstem reservoirs to take advantage of the hydraulic head created by the Middle Fork's steep drop. As a result, much of the Middle Fork is dewatered during the drier months.

See also

List of rivers of California

References

External links

Rivers of the Sierra Nevada (United States)
Rivers of Tuolumne County, California
Stanislaus National Forest
Rivers of Northern California
Rivers of the Sierra Nevada in California